"Hand Me Down My Walking Cane" is a song written by African-American James A. Bland in 1880. It has acquired the status of a folk song, and is cataloged as Roud Folk Song Index No. 11,733.

Recordings 

The song has been recorded many times, in a variety of styles including country, cajun, jazz, mountain, bluegrass, rock and roll, and acoustic and electric blues. Recordings by artists having Wikipedia articles include:

 Gid Tanner and His Skillet Lickers with Riley Puckett (1926)
 Kelly Harrell (1926), Victor 20103
 Earl Johnson (1927) (unreleased)
 Ernest V. Stoneman (1927) Edison Record 11481
 Sid Harkreader and Grady Moore (1927) Paramount Records 3022
 Karl Radlach and His Orchestra (directed by Bernie Cummins) (1930)
 Cléoma Breaux (1937), Decca 17059
 Jerry Lee Lewis (1956), Sun Records
 Bing Crosby included the song in a medley on his album 101 Gang Songs (1961)
 Vern Williams and Ray Parks (1966), The Cabale, Berkeley, CA
 Norman Blake, Whiskey Before Breakfast (1976)
 The Knitters, Poor Little Critter on the Road (1985)
 On The Skillet Lickers Vol. 1 (192627), Document Records
 Robert Earl Keen, Gravitational Forces  (2001), Lost Highway Records
 Michael Knott (2003), Spring 2003 Tour CD #2, independent
 Lavay Smith and Her Red Hot Skillet Lickers (2005)
 Junior Wells and Pistol Pete (bluesman), Chicago Blues Jam Vol. 5 (DVD) (2005)
 Charlie Byrd and the Charlie Byrd Ensemble (2008), Great Chefs. Great Music 
 Jack Rose and the Black Twig Pickers (2009), Jack Rose and the Black Twig Pickers, Klang Industries
 Arthur "Big Boy" Crudup
 Tex Morton
 Carson Robison

References in other songs 
The 1945 song "Look on Yonder Wall" includes the line "Look on yonder wall, hand me down my walkin' cane".
"Please Don't Bury Me", on John Prine's 1973 album Sweet Revenge, has the line "Hand me down my walking cane / It's a sin to tell a lie", which also references the 1936 song "It's a Sin to Tell a Lie"
The opening line of the 1976 song "The Rubberband Man" from the album Happiness Is Being with the Spinners is "Hand me down my walking cane / Hand me down my hat" (lyrics Linda Creed, music Thom Bell).
 The 1985 Dire Straits song "Walk of Life" includes the lyric "Here comes Johnny, gonna tell you the story / Hand me down my walkin' shoes". 
 The 2002 Guy Clark song "Soldier’s Joy, 1864" includes the lyric "Hand me down my walking cane / I ain’t cut out for war". 
Bob Dylan sings the line "Hand Me Down My Walking Cane" in his song "Ain't Talkin'" on his 2006 album Modern Times.

References 

1880 songs
1926 singles
American songs
Blackface minstrel songs
Jerry Lee Lewis songs
Songs written by James A. Bland